Dan Green (born November 26) is an American comic book illustrator, working as an inker primarily from the early 1970s to the present. He has often provided the finished art after receiving breakdowns by artists such as John Romita Sr., John Romita Jr., John Byrne, John Buscema,  Sal Buscema, Marc Silvestri, George Pérez, Keith Giffen, Gene Colan, Jack Kirby, Steve Ditko, Carmine Infantino, Al Williamson, Bernie Wrightson and Keith Pollard.

Career
Green has a lengthy career as an inker, working from the mid-1970s to the present day, including long runs on Spider-Man, Doctor Strange, Uncanny X-Men, Wolverine and Hulk for Marvel Comics, and DC's Justice League of America.

He co-wrote and provided watercolor illustrations for the graphic novel Doctor Strange: Into Shamballa for Marvel in 1986.

He also provided cover paintings for issues of Amazing High Adventure and an issue of Gargoyle for Marvel in 1985.

In 2001, a collection of works by Edgar Allan Poe entitled The Raven & Other Poems & Tales (Bulfinch Press) featured 20 of his pencil illustrations.
Green lives in upstate New York, in the Hudson Valley, New Paltz area.

Bibliography

Interior comics work includes:Animal Man the New 52 01- (2011-)Astonishing X-Men 02 (1995) Age of ApocalypseDefenders 57 (1978)Jack of Fables 32 (2009)Uncanny X-Men 107, 179-261, 300-322, 423-424, 437, 436 (Marvel Comics, 1977, 1984–1990, 1993–1995, 2003, 2004)Web of Spider-Man 03 (2010)

Covers
Cover work includes:New Mutants'' vol. 1 #50 (cover inks)

Notes

References

External links

Living people
Year of birth missing (living people)
American comics artists
Place of birth missing (living people)